Ryan Ogren is an American songwriter, record producer and vocal producer signed to Prescription Songs. He began his musical career playing in the band Don't Look Down, and then later Over It and Runner Runner. More recently, Ogren has been writing and producing records for artists like Doja Cat, Maroon 5, The Kid Laroi, Kim Petras, Saweetie, Lil Wayne, Coi Leray, Dirty Heads, amongst others.

Raised in Vineland, New Jersey, Ogren attended Vineland High School.

Career

Band Career

Don't Look Down 
As the vocalist/guitarist/songwriter in Don't Look Down, Ogren was signed to Nitro Records (Dexter Holland of The Offspring's label) and toured with Fall Out Boy, Yellowcard, and many others.

Over It 
In 2005, Ogren joined Over It as a guitarist, keyboardist, and background vocalist. The band was signed to Virgin Records and released Step Outside Yourself.

Runner Runner 
Members of Over It and Rufio joined together to form Runner Runner, which was signed to EMI and achieved radio success with their songs "So Obvious" (charted at No. 34 on the pop charts) and "I Can't Wait".

Songwriting Career 
In 2012, Ogren began recording records for other artists. He co-wrote the Gold single "Say You're Just A Friend (Feat Flo Rida)" by Austin Mahone, and shortly thereafter signed an exclusive publishing deal with Prescription Songs. In coming years, Ogren collaborated with numerous artists including Jack & Jack, Maroon 5, Backstreet Boys, Steve Aoki, Kim Petras, Doja Cat, Lauv, and many more.

Selected writing and production discography

References

American male singer-songwriters
Living people
1980 births
People from Vineland, New Jersey
Vineland High School alumni
Singer-songwriters from New Jersey